La Liberté is a Winnipeg, Manitoba, Canada based newspaper founded on May 20, 1913 by Archbishop Adélard Langevin of Saint-Boniface.

La Liberté is currently the only French-speaking provincial weekly newspaper in Manitoba.

History 
In 1970, the publication was taken over by Presse-Ouest Limitée which is owned by the francophone cultural organization la Société Franco-Manitobaine (SFM). Its headquarters are at 123 Marion Street in St. Boniface.

The newspaper celebrated its 85th anniversary in 1998. It has a staff of ten people. In 2013, La Liberté celebrated a hundred years of news in Manitoba, en français.

See also
List of newspapers in Canada

References

External links
  

Weekly newspapers published in Manitoba
French-language newspapers published in Canada
Newspapers established in 1913
1913 establishments in Manitoba
Franco-Manitoban culture
Newspapers published in Winnipeg